Oscar Fredrik Church is a church in Olivedal in Gothenburg, Sweden. It was drawn by Helgo Zetterwall and erected in the 1890s. Belonging to the Gothenburg Oscar Fredrik Parish of the Church of Sweden (Swedish: Svenska Kyrkan), it was opened on Easter Sunday 1893. The style is Neo Gothic, but the influence is not the Nordic gothic style but rather the style one can find in the large cathedrals in continental Europe. The church and the parish got its name from king Oscar II (Oscar Fredrik being his full name).

References

External links

Churches in Gothenburg
19th-century Church of Sweden church buildings
Churches completed in 1893
Churches in the Diocese of Gothenburg
Gothic Revival church buildings in Sweden